Vjekoslav "Alojz" Bastl (1872–1947) was a Croatian architect known for his diverse secessionist architectural style. His work circulated mostly within the boundaries of Zagreb, where he resided. Later in life, he got heavily influenced by modernism. Today, he is regarded as one of the highlights of early modern architecture in Croatia.

Biography
Bastl was born on 13 August 1872 to an ethnic Czech family originating from a Bohemian town Příbram. He eventually moved to Zagreb where he established a status as an architect working for the Hönigsberg & Deutsch atelier. His motives for emigrating to Croatia remain unknown (Croatian lands and Czech lands were part of one empire at the time). Upon arrival, he enrolled in the Royal crafts school, graduating in 1896.

Work
Arranged chronologically: 

 Pečić House - 43 Ilica st. (1899)
 Ethnographic Museum, Zagreb (1902)
 Rado House - 5 Ban Jelačić square (1904–1905)
 Feller House - Ban Jelačić square (1905–1906)
 Kallina House, 20 Gundulićeva st.
 Hrvatsko-slavonska zemaljska štedionica - Ilica 25
 Goršak House - 166 Ilica st. (1906)
 Hodovsky House - 47 Gajeva st. (1909–1910)
 Hotel Manduševac - Vlaška st. (1920)

Sources

Vjekoslav Bastl 
Bastl, Vjekoslav 

1872 births
1947 deaths
Austro-Hungarian people
20th-century Croatian people
Croatian architects
Yugoslav architects
Art Nouveau architects
Croatian people of Czech descent
Burials at Mirogoj Cemetery